Déjame Decir Que Te Amo is the debut album released in 1985 by Guatemalan singer-songwriter Ricardo Arjona.

Reception
The Allmusic review awarded the album 3 stars.

Track listing
All tracks by Ricardo Arjona except where noted

 "Déjame decir que te amo" (Let Me Say I Love You) – 4:20
 "Por amor" (For Love) – 3:44
 "Monotonía" (Monotony) – 2:58
 "Y ahora tú te me vas" (And Now You Go Away From Me) – 3:37
 "No renunciaré" (I won't quit) (Luis Alva) - 4:15
 "Vete con el sol" (Go With The Sun) – 4:22
 "Romeo y Julieta" (Romeo And Juliet) – 3:48
 "Hay amor" (There's Love) (Victor Manuel San José) – 3:45
 "Se ha ido el amor" (Love Has Gone Away) – 4:13
 "Ladrón" (Thief) – 2:12

Personnel 

 Ricardo Arjona – vocals

References 

1985 debut albums
Ricardo Arjona albums